Sledge is a 2014 American horror film directed by John B Sovie II and Kristian Hanson, starring Kristian Hanson, Dustin Bowman and Tino Faygo.

Cast
 Kristian Hanson as Adam Lynch
 Dustin Bowman as Alex
 Tino Faygo as Dickie
 Stephanie Tupper as Sarah
 Travis Hanson as Shawn
 Desiree Holmes as Michelle
 Rachel Cornell as Couch Girl
 Wendy Miller as Blanket Couple
 Troy Miller as Blanket Couple

Reception
HorrorNews.net wrote that "While it never delivers huge scares, ‘Sledge’ tickles and entertains in nearly all the right places." Mark L. Miller of Ain't It Cool News called it "an ambitious and well intentioned experiment that just isn’t so successful at mixing subgenres and telling an engaging tale."

Richard Axtell of Nerdly wrote that "while it tried to be both funny and horrific, it never managed to really achieve either." Debi Moore of Dread Central gave the film a rating of 1.5 out of 5, writing that "it’s just too painful to sit through."

References

External links
 
 

American horror films
2014 horror films